A Short History of the English People is a book written by English historian John Richard Green. Published in 1874, "it is a history, not of English Kings or English Conquests, but of the English People."

Background and reception 
Green began work on the book in 1869, having been given only six months to live after being hit hard by disease that had plagued him throughout his life. Only having around 800 pages to write on, he had to leave out much of what he wanted to include. Green intentionally left out the battles of England feeling they did not play a big role in the formation of the nation, saying that historians "too often turned history into a mere record of the butchery of men by their fellow men." His new ideas, and omission of information that others felt important, meant Green was criticized by other historians as well as the people close to him.

Others thought highly of the book, including Francis Adams, who used quotations from the book in his poem The Peasants' Revolt.

Notes

Bibliography

External links
The 1902–3 Macmillan illustrated-edition of the work at the Internet Archive:
Volume I
Volume II
Volume III
Volume IV

1874 non-fiction books
History books about England